The Fermilab Center for Particle Astrophysics is a part of Fermilab that unifies the astrophysics program at Fermilab and teaches and studies the interface of particle physics and cosmology.

The center is headed by Craig Hogan, director and Dan Bauer, deputy director.

See also
 Fermilab Holometer

References

Fermilab